Gloria Williamson ( - August 14, 2014) was an American politician. A member of the Democratic Party, she served in the Mississippi Senate from 2000 to 2008. She was married to Ed Williamson, and they had four children. She lived in Philadelphia, Mississippi.

Williamson was Miss Neshoba County (Neshoba County).

References

1940s births
2014 deaths
Women state legislators in Mississippi
People from Philadelphia, Mississippi
21st-century American politicians
Mississippi state senators
21st-century American women politicians

Year of birth missing